Yang Yiyang (born 15 March 1986) is a Chinese sport shooter.

He participated at the 2018 ISSF World Shooting Championships, winning a medal.

References

External links

Living people
1986 births
Chinese male sport shooters
Trap and double trap shooters
Sportspeople from Luoyang
Universiade gold medalists for China
Universiade medalists in shooting
Sport shooters from Henan
Medalists at the 2011 Summer Universiade
Medalists at the 2013 Summer Universiade
21st-century Chinese people